The 2010 FxPro Cyprus Rally, was the 12th round of the 2010 Intercontinental Rally Challenge (IRC) season. The fourteen stage mixed surface rally took place over 4–6 November 2010. As well as being the final round of the IRC, the event formed the penultimate round of the 2010 Middle East Rally Championship (MERC).

Introduction
The rally, which was based in Limassol, had a  all-asphalt Super Special Stage, purpose-built at Limassol's extensive port facilities being run twice during the event. With both the drivers and manufacturers titles already decided none of the top competitors in the IRC made the trip to the event. Andreas Mikkelsen, who was seventh in the championship heading into the event, was the highest placed driver to take part. Other IRC regulars included Daniel Oliveira and Burcu Çetinkaya. Nasser Al-Attiyah headed the field of drivers competing in the MERC.

Results

Overall

Special stages

References

External links 
 The official website for the rally
 The official website of the Intercontinental Rally Challenge

Cyprus Rally
Rally
Cyprus